Louis Houghton was an English professional rugby league footballer who played in the 1920s and 1930s.

Playing career

International honours
Lou Houghton won caps for England while at St. Helens in 1927 against Wales, and while at Wigan in 1931 against Wales.

Challenge Cup Final appearances
Louis Houghton played right-, i.e. number 10, and scored a try in St. Helens' 3–10 defeat by Widnes in the 1929–30 Challenge Cup Final at Wembley Stadium, London on Saturday 3 May 1930, in front of a crowd of 36,544.

County Cup Final appearances
Lou Houghton played right-, i.e. number 10, in St. Helens' 10-2 victory over St Helens Recs in the 1926 Lancashire County Cup Final during the 1926–27 season at Wilderspool Stadium, Warrington on Saturday 20 November 1926.

References

External links
Profile at saints.org.uk
Statistics at wigan.rlfans.com

1905 births
England national rugby league team players
English rugby league players
Place of birth missing
Place of death missing
Rugby league props
Rugby league second-rows
St Helens R.F.C. players
Wigan Warriors players
Year of death missing